Air Loyauté is a French airline company which operates in New Caledonia. It is the main airline service for the Loyalty Islands and provides scheduled, medivac and charter services.

Destinations
Air Loyauté flies to: Nouméa, Koumac, Belep, Touho on Grande Terre and Maré, Tiga, Lifou and Ouvéa in the Loyalty Islands.

Current fleet 
The Air Loyauté fleet consists of the following aircraft (as of June 2019):

References

Airlines of France
Airlines of New Caledonia